A Crow Left of the Murder... is the fifth studio album by the American rock band Incubus, released on February 3, 2004. The album marks the first appearance of bassist Ben Kenney, following the departure of founding member Dirk Lance.

Music and lyrics

The music of A Crow Left of the Murder... incorporates elements of art rock, alternative metal, jazz, pop and progressive rock. The work of guitarist Mike Einziger takes equal prominence in focus to that of vocalist Brandon Boyd, in contrast to previous albums which focused more prominently on Boyd's vocalization.

The singles from the album are "Megalomaniac" and "Talk Shows on Mute". "Agoraphobia" was released as a promo single. Early pressings of the album list track 12 "Smile Lines" as "Suite Lines" on the back cover. The Japanese pressing of the album comes with a bonus track, "Monuments & Melodies" which is also available on the Alive at Red Rocks bonus CD.

Commercial response
The album debuted at number two on the U.S. Billboard 200, selling about 332,000 copies in its first week on the chart. It has since gone on to sell 1.9 million copies and has been certified platinum by the RIAA.

Reception
A Crow Left of the Murder... was generally well received by critics upon release. Stuart Green of Canadian publication Exclaim! gave it a positive review in March 2004, he wrote "with the addition of soulful Roots bassist Ben Kenney and a tasty fusion of everything from Faith No More-style rap metal to the prog-noodling of Rush (most notably on 'Sick Sad Little World', the album's standout track) to the earnest songwriting of, say, the Beatles or the Dave Matthews Band, this disc should establish them as the leaders of the new rock pack... at least in artistry if not sales."

Stephen Thomas Erlewine of AllMusic awarded the album four-and-a-half out of five stars, claiming that, "at the beginning of their career, Incubus was rightly lumped in with the legions of post-Korn alt metal/rap-rock bands swarming America in the latter days of the 20th century", and that, "A Crow Left of the Murder... is far more interesting than any of their other records, or their peers."  Mikael Wood of the Dallas Observer reflected in his review that, "Southern California's Incubus emerged from the rap-rock pack in 2001 when its hit single 'Drive' revealed front man Brandon Boyd to be the kind of guy who might come back to his high school nine years after he graduated to give a motivational speech and award one lucky essay-writing girl an unforgettable dance at the senior prom. Before that the band played warmed-over funk-metal and made CDs with really awful covers." He adds, "Boyd freaks his falsetto a lot, giving 'Smile Lines' and 'Beware! Criminal' a supple, sensual curvature that's anathema to most rap-rockers; there's a defanged Tori Amos/Trent Reznor pulse to 'Sick Sad Little World'; 'Pistola' is almost post-punk in its compact fury'." Joshua Klein of The Washington Post stated, "A Crow Left of the Murder shows success has gone to the band's head, but only in the best sense. Here Incubus reverts to its weirder, wilder roots without abandoning its newfound pop appeal."  Daily Collegian reviewer Nick Romanow noted, "while S.C.I.E.N.C.E. may have been one of the best albums of the past 10 years, this is no longer the same Incubus of 1997. This is the Incubus of 2004, and that is a damn good thing."

Eric R. Danton of The Baltimore Sun wrote in February 2004, "alternative-metal bands have tended to embody self-absorption far more than self-awareness, and we've all seen how that has turned out: It's made Fred Durst wealthy in inverse proportion to his talent. Incubus, at least, has avoided many of the petulant excesses that fuel Limp Bizkit and Linkin Park. With a few pop-savvy ballads and a hottie front man in Brandon Boyd, Incubus has even attracted an audience that encompasses more than surly teen-age boys." He added, "the alt-metal sound is mostly played out, but Incubus' determination to continue developing is clear here, and it will help to keep the band relevant in an increasingly splintered music scene."

In their March 2004 review, The Oklahoman wrote that, "its finest moments recalls the more adventurous musical explorations of their major label debut S.C.I.E.N.C.E.", noting that "Megalomaniac", "Pistola", "Priceless" and "Leech" possess a "caffeine-fueled drive." They additionally observed that, "of course, there had to be a couple of idealistic love ballads for the young women who really are only interested in singer Brandon Boyd. To fill that slot, the album's 'Southern Girl' and the piano-driven 'Here in My Room' feature a harmony at their conclusion reminiscent of something off The Beach Boys' Pet Sounds."

Legacy
In 2017, Dan Weiss of Consequence of Sound had a negative view of the band's direction on A Crow Left of the Murder..., writing that it was "their most strident record to date, and by then their eclecticism was so pared down you couldn't hear much Faith No More or hip-hop or quirky distinctions."

Kerrang! ranked it as the second best Incubus album in 2020, and stated it "[was] the sound of Incubus maturing; finding ever-subtler applications for their melting pot of styles."

Track listing

When bought at some retailers (including Best-Buy) a bonus live EP was bundled with the CD.

Bonus DVD
"Lollapalooza"  – 9:13
 Includes a brief interview discussing the Lollapalooza tour, then performances of "Megalomaniac" and "Pistola".
"Bridge Benefit"  – 8:41
 Includes a brief interview discussing the Bridge School Benefit, follow by acoustic performances of "A Crow Left of the Murder" and "Talk Shows on Mute"
While We Were Out  – 7:35
 This documentary is about the making of the album in Atlanta, Georgia, as well as some interview footage, and some footage of other things the band have gotten up to whilst they were out. It also introduces Ben Kenney, who recently joined as the bassist for the band.
Brandon's Injury  – 1:06
 A short mock-umentary about how Brandon injured his ankle.
Short Film  – 6:31
 Although not listed on the packaging, there is also a short film by Brendan Hearne, starring Mike Einziger.

A SACD edition has also been released, along with a Dualdisc edition as well.

Personnel

Incubus
Brandon Boyd – vocals
Mike Einziger – guitar; piano on "Here In My Room", additional engineering
Ben Kenney – bass
Chris Kilmore – turntables, keyboards, mellotron, marxophone
José Pasillas – drums, percussion

Production
Brendan O'Brien – production, mixing
Nick DiDia – engineer
Billy Bowers – additional engineering
Bob Ludwig – mastering

Charts

Weekly charts

Year-end charts

Certifications

References

2004 albums
Incubus (band) albums
Epic Records albums
Albums produced by Brendan O'Brien (record producer)